V1bes is the second mixtape by American singer and actor Leon Thomas III released on January 1, 2014 by Rostrum Records at midnight via DatPiff. It features remixes of the song "Bonita Applebum" by A Tribe Called Quest, and "Wu-Tang Forever" by rapper Drake. The song "Chill" contains samples from the 1989 Spike Lee film Do the Right Thing.

Track listing
Thomas composed all of the songs himself, except where noted.

References

2014 mixtape albums
Leon Thomas III albums